Myosin-7B also known as myosin, heavy chain 7B is a protein that in humans is encoded by the MYH7B gene.

Function 

MYH7B is a slow-twitch myosin.

References

Further reading